Mahsa University is a private medical university in Petaling Jaya, Malaysia. It was founded in Pusat Bandar Damansara in 2005 as a college, and was upgraded to university status in 2009.

The university offers academic programs in various fields including medicine, dentistry, nursing, pharmacy, engineering, business, and law. Health courses are offered in conjunction with Northumbria University.

References

External links

2005 establishments in Malaysia
Educational institutions established in 2005
Petaling Jaya
Universities and colleges in Selangor